China Fortune 2017 Jingjinji Champions Cup - Beijing was the second edition of Jingjinji Champions Cup. The tournament was hosted by Beijing Sinobo Guoan in Beijing. Hebei China Fortune defended the title by beating invited team Tianjin Quanjian 7–0 in the final.

Participating teams
Beijing Sinobo Guoan (Host)
Hebei China Fortune
Tianjin Quanjian (Invited team)
Tianjin Teda

Competition format
The competition took the format of a regular knock-out competition. The winners of each of the two matches on the first day competed against each other for the Jingjinji Champions Cup, whilst the two losing sides played in a third-place match. If a match was level after normal time then a penalty shoot-out would be played to decide who advanced.

Matches
All times are local (China Standard Time;  UTC+8).

Semi-finals

Third place play-off

Final

References

Jingjinji Champions Cup
2017 in Chinese football